Amazing is an album by Elkie Brooks.

Recorded in 1996 and released on CD and cassette in 1996 through Carlton Classics, the album reached number 49 and remained in the UK charts for 2 weeks.

Track listing 
"Nights in White Satin"
"One More Heartache"
"Our Love"
"Lilac Wine"
"From the Heart"
"Paint Your Pretty Picture"
"Gasoline Alley"
"Minutes"
"Will You Write Me a Song"
"Don't Cry out Loud"
"Growing Tired"
"Round Midnight"
"It All Comes Back on You"
"We've Got Tonight"
"Off the Beaten Track"
"No More the Fool"
"Only Women Bleed"

Personnel 
Elkie Brooks – vocals
Andrew Murray – piano, keyboards
The Royal Philharmonic Orchestra – orchestra
Trevor Jordan – engineering, production

1996 albums
Elkie Brooks albums